The Hobson Performance Center, formerly called the D. Rich Memorial building prior to 2020, is the centerpiece educational building on the Buies Creek, North Carolina campus of Campbell University that was completed in 1923. The building anchors the Academic Circle portion of the main campus and houses numerous classrooms and faculty offices, as well as Campbell's Turner Auditorium.

Name change to Hobson Performance Center 
On January 9, 2020, D. Rich Memorial was changed to Hobson Performance Center after the recent donation by the Hobson family.

References

Campbell University